Paul Pfann (18 April 1860, Nuremberg - 1 August 1919, Nuremberg) was a German architect in the Historicist style.

Life and work 
His father was a primary school teacher. From 1879 to 1883, he studied architecture at the Technical University of Munich with Friedrich von Thiersch and Paul Wallot. From 1884 to 1887, he also collaborated with the architectural firm of Arwed Roßbach, in Leipzig. From 1887 to 1891, he assisted Paul Wallot during the construction of the Reichstag building in Berlin. In 1890, he entered a competition to design the National Kaiser Wilhelm Monument. 

From 1891 to 1892, he served as an assistant Professor for freehand drawing at the Technical University, and from 1893 was a Privatdozent for sketching from nature. From 1900 to 1908 he was "Professor without Chair" for drawing, decorative architecture and perspective. In 1908, he became a full Professor.

Sources
 Biography and drawings @ the University of Heidelberg
 Katharina Blohm, Architekturschule München 1868-1993: 125 Jahre Technische Universität München, Klinkhardt + Biermann, 1993  (Google Books)

External links 

 Brief biography and drawings @ NordOstKultur München
 Catalog of Pfann's estate @ Kalliope-Verbund
 Entry on Pfann @ the Deutsche Biographie
 Drawings and plans by Pfann @ the Architecture Museum of the Technische Universität Berlin
 Project sketches @ the library of the Technical University of Munich

1860 births
1919 deaths
19th-century German architects
Historicist architecture in Germany
Architects from Nuremberg
Technical University of Munich alumni